Ali Ismail Doka (born 11 May 1973) is a Qatari sprinter. He competed in the men's 4 × 400 metres relay at the 1996 Summer Olympics.

References

External links
 

1973 births
Living people
Athletes (track and field) at the 1996 Summer Olympics
Qatari male sprinters
Qatari male hurdlers
Olympic athletes of Qatar
Place of birth missing (living people)
Asian Games medalists in athletics (track and field)
Asian Games bronze medalists for Qatar
Athletes (track and field) at the 1994 Asian Games
Athletes (track and field) at the 1998 Asian Games
Medalists at the 1994 Asian Games